Arthur Niederhoffer (1917 – January 14, 1981) was an American sociologist. For 21 years, he was a police officer with the New York City Police Department (NYPD). Niederhoffer's 1967 book Behind the Shield is widely considered a classic in policing literature.

Bibliography
 (1958) The Gang: A Study in Adolescent Behavior (with Herbert Aaron Bloch). Philosophical Library.
 (1967) Behind The Shield: The Police in Urban Society. Doubleday.
 (1970) The Ambivalent Force: Perspectives on The Police (with Abraham S. Blumberg). Ginn.
 (1974) New Directions in Police-Community Relations (with Alexander B. Smith). Rinehart Press. 
 (1978) The Police Family: From Station House to Ranch House (with Elaine Niederhoffer).  Lexington Books.

References

1917 births
1981 deaths
American sociologists
New York City Police Department officers